NA-231 Karachi Malir-II is a newly-created a constituency for the National Assembly of Pakistan. It mainly comprises the Ibrahim Hyderi Subdivision, and some areas of Korangi Creek Cantonment. It was created in the 2018 delimitation from the bifurcation of the old NA-257.

Members of Parliament

2018-2022: NA-238 Karachi Malir-III

Election 2018 

General elections were held on 25 July 2018.

See also
NA-230 Karachi Malir-I
NA-232 Karachi Malir-III

References 

Karachi